The Congo may refer to the Congo River in central Africa or the Congo Basin, the sedimentary basin of the river.

Congo may refer to either of two countries that border the river:

 Democratic Republic of the Congo, the larger country to the southeast, sometimes referred to as "Congo-Kinshasa"
 Republic of the Congo, the smaller country to the northwest, sometimes referred to as "Congo-Brazzaville"

Congo or Kongo may also refer to:

Places

Africa 
 Congo Canyon, a submarine canyon
 Kingdom of Kongo (1390–1914)
 Kingdom of Kakongo (15th century–1885)
 Congo Free State (1885–1908)
 Republic of the Congo (Léopoldville) or Congo-Léopoldville (1960–1971)
 People's Republic of the Congo (1969–1992)
 Kongo, Ghana, town in Ghana
 Kongo, Liberia, small town in Liberia

Former colonies
 Belgian Congo
 French Congo
 Portuguese Congo

United States 
 Congo, Alabama
 Congo, Missouri
 Congo, Pennsylvania
 Congo, West Virginia

Elsewhere 
 Congo, New South Wales, Australia
 Congo, Paraíba, Brazil
 Congo River (disambiguation), a list of rivers with the name
 Congo Town, a village in Andros Island, Bahamas
 Congo Volcano or Congo Mountain, in Costa Rica

Languages and ethnic groups 
 Niger–Congo languages
 Kongo languages
 Kongo language, a Bantu language
 Kongo people, a Bantu ethnic group

Arts and entertainment

Music 
 The Congos, a reggae vocal group from Jamaica
 Congo (album), 1979 
 "Congo" (song), by Genesis, 1997
 Kongos (band), a South African American band

Other uses in arts, entertainment, and media
 Congo (novel), a 1980 novel by Michael Crichton
 Congo (film), a 1995 film based on the novel
 Congo (chess variant), using a 7×7 gameboard
 Congo (pinball), a 1995 pinball machine
 Congo (TV series), a 2001 nature documentary
 Congo – A Political Tragedy, a 2018 documentary film
 Congo: The Epic History of a People, a 2010 book by David van Reybrouck
 Kongo (1932 film), an American film

People
 Edwin Congo (born 1976), Colombian footballer 
 Louis Congo (fl. 1725), emancipated slave appointed public executioner of French Louisiana
 Richard Congo (born 1961), American basketball player
 Cheick Kongo (born 1975), French mixed martial arts fighter and kickboxer
 John Kongos (born 1945), South African singer and songwriter
 Kongo Kong, wrestling ring name of Steven Wilson (born 1979)

Other uses 
 Congo (chimpanzee), a chimpanzee who learned how to draw and paint
 Congo (loa), a voodoo spirit 
 Congo Airways, the flag carrier of the Democratic Republic of the Congo
 Congo Airlines, a former airline
 , a Royal Navy ship
 Conference of NGOs (CoNGO), a membership association of non-governmental organizations
 Kongo University, in the Democratic Republic of the Congo
 Congo Brands, the manufacturer of Prime (drink)

See also 
 
 
 
 
 Conga (disambiguation)
 Congolese (disambiguation)
 King Kong (disambiguation)
 Kongō (disambiguation)
 Kongolo (disambiguation)
 Congoid, an outdated historical grouping of various people
 Kakongo, former kingdom

Language and nationality disambiguation pages